Orisi Cavuilati is a Fijian former professional rugby league footballer who represented Fiji at the 1995 World Cup.

Playing career
Cavuilati signed for the Sydney Bulldogs in 1995 from Fijian rugby union. He was a regular in the Bulldogs reserve grade and was selected for the Fijian national squad for the 1995 World Cup where he started one match on the wing.

In 2003 Cavuilati received a bravery award for punching an armed bank robber to the ground.

References

Living people
Fijian rugby league players
Fiji national rugby league team players
Canterbury-Bankstown Bulldogs players
Rugby league wingers
Fijian rugby union players
I-Taukei Fijian people
Year of birth missing (living people)